Along the Rio Grande is a 1941 American Western film directed by Edward Killy and starring Tim Holt. The female lead was Betty Jane Rhodes.

Plot
A young cowhand and two friends join forces to avenge the murder of their former boss.

Cattle rustler Doc Randall holds a gun on rancher Pop Edwards while three hands, Jeff, Smokey and Whopper, are making a deposit for Pop at the bank. The boys get word Pop needs the money back, but when the banker refuses, they steal it and flee, chased by a posse. They return to find Pop dead. They are arrested, although the sheriff is sure someone else did the killing.

After an arrest and a jailbreak, cantina singer Mary Lawry doesn't care to get involved with Jeff until he confides he's working undercover for the law. Doc is tipped off by saloon girl Paula, who overhears Jeff's conversation with Mary. A trap is set, but Jeff and Doc trade punches until Smokey arrives with the lawmen, just in time.

Cast
 Tim Holt as Jeff
 Betty Jane Rhodes as Mary
 Ray Whitley as Smokey
 Robert Fiske as Doc
 Ruth Clifford as Paula
 Emmett Lynn as Whopper

References

External list
 
 
 
 

1941 films
American Western (genre) films
1941 Western (genre) films
RKO Pictures films
Films directed by Edward Killy
Films produced by Bert Gilroy
American black-and-white films
1940s American films